Guy R. Cornelis is a Belgian microbiologist.

Life 
Cornelis graduated in pharmacist, studied  in Oxford, UK and received his PhD from the University of Louvain, Belgium in 1974. He studied antibiotic resistance plasmids in Bristol (UK) and transposons at the University of Freiburg and at the Max Planck Institute in Cologne, Germany. After his appointment as Professor in Louvain in 1984, he investigated bacterial pathogenesis and joined in 1991 the Christian de Duve Institute in Brussels. In 2001, he was appointed Professor of Molecular Microbiology at the Biozentrum, University of Basel, Switzerland. Since emeritus in 2012, he pursues his research at the University of Namur, Belgium.

Work 
Cornelis investigates the complex mechanisms of bacterial infectious diseases. He received particular recognition for the co-discovery with H. Wolf-Watz (Umea, Sweden) of the bacterial type III secretion system (T3SS). T3SS is a mechanism by which many bacteria inject a cocktail of toxins, so-called effector proteins into animal, plant or insect cells. The effectors disarm or reprogram the target cell by sabotaging the cellular signaling network. The T3SS apparatus, called injectisome, is a complex nanosyringe made of more than 25 different proteins. Since 2004, Cornelis also studies Capnocytophaga canimorsus, a bacterium from dog's mouths responsible for fatal infections in humans.

 Cornelis belongs to the world’s most cited scientists.

Awards and honors 
1980: Prize of the Belgian Royal Academy of Medicine
1985: Pfizer Prize
1993: Member of the Belgian Royal Academy of Medicine
1998 Elected Member of the European Molecular Biology Organization (EMBO)
2008: Member of the American Academy for Microbiology (AAM)

References

External links 
University of Namur: Guy Cornelis
Biozentrum University of Basel
ERC Advanced Investigator Grant
Book: Toxin – the cunning of bacterial poisons by Alistair Lax

Living people
Université catholique de Louvain
University of Freiburg
Members of the European Molecular Biology Organization
Biozentrum University of Basel
Academic staff of the Université de Namur
Year of birth missing (living people)